The 1987 Gent–Wevelgem was the 49th edition of the Gent–Wevelgem cycle race and was held on 8 April 1987. The race started in Ghent and finished in Wevelgem. The race was won by Teun van Vliet of the Panasonic team.

General classification

References

Gent–Wevelgem
1987 in road cycling
1987 in Belgian sport
1987 Super Prestige Pernod International